Squadron Leader John Peters (born 1961) is a former pilot of the Royal Air Force (RAF).

Early life
He attended the independent Churcher's College in east Hampshire, leaving in 1980.

By the age of 17, he had his pilot's licence. He attended the University of Manchester Institute of Science and Technology (commonly known as UMIST, now part of the University of Manchester since 2004), gaining a BSc in Building Technology in 1983. He was an RAF university cadet, joining the RAF in 1979, training at RAF Woodvale with the Manchester and Salford Universities Air Squadron. He later graduated with an MBA from the University of Leicester.

Career
After his RAF training, he was based at RAF Chivenor, RAF Lossiemouth and RAF Laarbruch.

He became a staff pilot in 1987 at the Air Navigation School (ANS) of No. 6 Flying Training School at RAF Finningley. In 1988, he moved to XV Squadron at RAF Laarbruch after converting to the Tornado GR1 as a Flight Lieutenant.

Gulf War
On his first mission during Operation Desert Storm, aged 29, an ultra-low level daylight mission on Ar Rumaylah Southwest Air Base, while acting as number two to Squadron Leader Paul "Pablo" Mason, his Panavia Tornado [http://www.aeroflight.co.uk/pics/gulfwar/torn/Tornado%20GR%201%20ZD791%20(BG-B)%20lost%20over%20Iraq.jpg GR.1'] of XV Squadron was hit at fifty feet by a shoulder-launched SAM SA-14, and he and his navigator (John Nichol) were captured by the military of Iraq. After capture he was shown, bruised and beaten, on television.He received around 25,000 letters from well-wishers following the appearance. He said that he was "treated very specially" as a result of his experiences and found it difficult to live up to the image the public had of him. At the end of the war he was released and returned to the RAF for a further ten years.

Instructor
Having been at RAF Brüggen, he moved to RAF Cottesmore in 1993, becoming an instructor on the TTTE. He graduated with an MBA from the University of Leicester Management Centre, with his dissertation being The Challenge of Change in the Royal Air Force'' .

He became a Squadron Leader in 1997, moving to Turkey, and left the RAF after 18 years.

Publications
Following repatriation by the Red Cross, Peters co-authored a book, Tornado Down, with his navigator, John Nichol. As of 2009 he works as a motivational speaker, often at university management schools. He is a practitioner of Myers-Briggs Type Indicator (MBTI). He has also worked as a representative of the Association of MBAs.

Since 1999, he has been a partner of UPH Ltd.

Personal life
He is married to Helen and has two children; a daughter Toni and a son Guy, who was commissioned into the Royal Tank Regiment. Guy won the Queen's Medal (awarded to the Officer Cadet gaining the highest score in military, practical and academic subjects) at the Royal Military Academy Sandhurst in 2014. The family live in Worcestershire near Bromsgrove. When at Cottesmore, and studying at the University of Leicester, Peters lived in Rutland.

References

External links
 UPH Ltd
 PBS documentary
 Page at Penguin Books
 University of Leicester
 Biographical video

News items
 Independent October 2004
 Independent August 1993

1961 births
Living people
Alumni of the University of Leicester
Alumni of the University of Manchester Institute of Science and Technology
British prisoners of war
English motivational speakers
Gulf War prisoners of war
People educated at Churcher's College
Royal Air Force officers
Royal Air Force personnel of the Gulf War
Shot-down aviators
Prisoners of war held by Iraq